Movimento Dinâmico e Cultural de Sandim Is an amateur futsal team based in Sandim, Portugal. It plays in Portuguese Futsal First Division.

Futsal

Current squad

Out on loan

Honours
Taça de Portugal de Futsal:
Runner-up (1): 2011–12
SuperTaça de Futsal de Portugal:
Runner-up (1): 2012

External links
Official website
viladesandim.org
Zerozero

Futsal clubs in Portugal